ActBlue is an American nonprofit technology organization established in June 2004 that enables left-leaning nonprofits, Democratic candidates, and progressive groups to raise money from individual donors on the Internet by providing them with online fundraising software. Its stated mission is to "empower small-dollar donors".

Activities

ActBlue does not endorse individual candidates. The organization is open to Democratic campaigns, candidates, committees, and progressive 501(c)4 organizations. Groups that use ActBlue pay a 3.95% credit card processing fee. As a nonprofit, ActBlue runs its own, separate fundraising program and accepts tips on contributions to pay for its expenses.

ActBlue was founded in 2004 by Benjamin Rahn and Matt DeBergalis. In February 2016, ActBlue launched AB Charities, an arm of the organization that makes ActBlue's fundraising tools available to nonprofits. Both the 2016 and 2020 Democratic presidential nominees, Hillary Clinton and Joe Biden, used ActBlue during their primary and general election campaigns. Bernie Sanders' 2016 and 2020 primary campaigns also used ActBlue for fundraising.

Federal Election Commission reporting
ActBlue reports to the Federal Election Commission all contributors to Federal campaigns, regardless of the amount. When a candidate for a Federal election raises money through ActBlue, ActBlue serves as a conduit for election law purposes. All conduit contributions are itemized and reported. By contrast, there is a $200 threshold for reporting individuals who contribute directly to a candidate committee. Many small donors, whose names would ordinarily be shielded, are thus exposed to the public.

Fundraising

ActBlue raised $19 million in its first three years, from 2004 to 2007. In the 2005-2006 campaign, the site raised $17 million for 1500 Democratic candidates, with $15.5 million going to congressional campaigns. By August 2007, the site had raised $25.5 million.

In the 2018 midterms elections, ActBlue raised $1.6 billion for Democratic candidates. Conor Lamb, Beto O'Rourke, and Kyrsten Sinema have worked with ActBlue.

In 2019, ActBlue raised roughly $1 billion for a wide variety of campaigns. The Daily Beast notes that between January and mid-July 2019, ActBlue brought in $420 million, and that "According to the organization, that total came from 3.3 million unique donors and was dispersed to almost 9,000 Democratic campaigns and organizations, with $246 million coming in the second quarter alone."

In 2020, several fundraising records were broken. In the week following the murder of George Floyd, on May 31, over $19 million was raised, the highest single-day total so far that year. On June 1, that yearly record was again broken with $20 million in donations. Over half of donations in the week following the killing went to charitable (non-political) causes, including one ActBlue page devoted to a bail fund which raised over $1.5 million from over 20,000 donors. In the day following the death of Supreme Court Justice Ruth Bader Ginsburg, over $30 million was donated through ActBlue, again breaking the single-day fundraising record.

In 2022, ActBlue brought in $20.6 million on the day the Supreme Court issued its opinion in Dobbs v. Jackson Women's Health Organization.

Opposing organizations
In 2019, the Republican Party created WinRed to similarly support Republican organizations and causes with small-donor fundraising.

References

External links
 

2004 establishments in Massachusetts
Democratic Party (United States) organizations
Organizations established in 2004